Henry Medina (born 16 March 1981) is a Guatemalan football defender. He currently plays for CD Suchitepéquez in Guatemala's top division.

Club career
Medina played for Deportivo Teculután prior to joining Guatemalan giants CSD Municipal in 2004. He left the squad after four years to play for Deportivo Xinabajul in Guatemala's top division. However, in November 2009, he announced his departure due to financial complications at the Huehuetenango club.

He subsequently joined Mazatenango side Suchi.

International career
Medina made his debut for Guatemala in a July 2004 friendly match against El Salvador in which game he immediately scored the only goal. He went on to collect a total of 18 caps, scoring 1 goal. He has represented his country at the UNCAF Nations Cup 2007 and was a member of the Guatemala national team for the 2007 CONCACAF Gold Cup.

Medina's final international was an August 2007 friendly match against Panama.

International goals
Scores and results list. Guatemala's goal tally first.

External links

References

1981 births
Living people
People from Escuintla Department
Association football defenders
Guatemalan footballers
Guatemala international footballers
2007 UNCAF Nations Cup players
2007 CONCACAF Gold Cup players
2011 Copa Centroamericana players
2011 CONCACAF Gold Cup players
C.S.D. Municipal players
C.D. Suchitepéquez players